Pistol Packin' Mama is a 1943 American comedy film directed by Frank Woodruff and written by Edward Dein and Fred Schiller. The film stars Ruth Terry, Robert Livingston, Wally Vernon, Jack La Rue, Kirk Alyn and Eddie Parker. The film was released on December 15, 1943, by Republic Pictures.

Plot

Cast  
Ruth Terry as Vicki Norris / Sally Benson
Robert Livingston as Nick Winner
Wally Vernon as The Joker
Jack La Rue as Johnny Rossi 
Kirk Alyn as J. Leslie Burton III
Eddie Parker as Mike
Joe Kirk as Joe McGurn
Helen Talbot as Young Wife
Lydia Bilbrook as Mrs. Burton
George Lessey as Mr. Burton
The King Cole Trio as The King Cole Trio

References

External links
 

1943 films
1943 musical comedy films
American black-and-white films
American musical comedy films
Films about gambling
Republic Pictures films
1940s English-language films
Films directed by Frank Woodruff
1940s American films